Fawni is an Austrian singer-songwriter, artist and actress.

Reality television

In 2014, Fawni starred in the American reality television series titled Euros of Hollywood which premiered on Bravo network on November 3, 2014. The show featured a group of Europeans trying to make it in America.

References 

Living people
Year of birth missing (living people)